Neptune Beach is a beachfront city east of Jacksonville in Duval County, Florida, United States. When the majority of Duval County communities consolidated with Jacksonville in 1968, Neptune Beach, along with Jacksonville Beach, Atlantic Beach and Baldwin remained quasi-independent. Like those other towns, it maintains its own municipal government but its residents vote in the Jacksonville mayoral election and are represented on the Jacksonville city council. The population was 7,037 at the 2010 census. Neptune Beach is part of the Jacksonville Beaches community.

History

Neptune Beach was originally part of Jacksonville Beach. Through its development, the part of Jacksonville Beach north of 20th Avenue North was sparsely populated, with a brick road (First Street) connecting the more populated southern area with Atlantic Beach. The name "Neptune Beach" originated in 1922 with Dan G. Wheeler, one of the few residents. Wheeler had a home at what is now One Ocean Hotel (now in Atlantic Beach), and had to walk all the way home from Mayport each evening after taking the Florida East Coast Railway train home from work in Jacksonville. A friend who worked for the railroad informed Wheeler that if he had a station, the train would have to stop for him, so Wheeler built his own train station near his home and named it Neptune.

Neptune seceded from Jacksonville Beach and incorporated as its own municipality in 1931, following a tax revolt. The comparatively few residents of the area were largely cut off from Jacksonville Beach city services such as police, fire, garbage collection, and road developments, though they paid taxes in equal share. The first mayor was O. O. McCollum, and the government met in Wheeler's old train station until a new town hall was completed in 1935.

Geography

Neptune Beach is located at  (30.316641, –81.403081).

Neptune Beach is one of several towns on San Pablo Island, which stretches through two counties (Duval and St. Johns) and extends from Naval Station Mayport at its northern tip to Vilano Beach in the south, across from St. Augustine.

Transportation

Major highways

Demographics

As of the census of 2010, there were 7,037 people, 3,282 households, and 1,857 families residing in the city. The racial makeup of the city was 96.08% White, 0.73% African American, 0.40% Native American, 1.03% Asian, 0.06% Pacific Islander, 0.52% from other races, and 1.18% from two or more races. Hispanic or Latino of any race were 2.09% of the population.

There were 3,282 households, out of which 24.2% had children under the age of 18 living with them, 44.9% were married couples living together, 8.2% had a female householder with no husband present, and 43.4% were non-families. 31.3% of all households were made up of individuals, and 7.7% had someone living alone who was 65 years of age or older. The average household size was 2.22 and the average family size was 2.85.

In the city, the population was spread out, with 19.3% under the age of 18, 8.4% from 18 to 24, 33.3% from 25 to 44, 26.9% from 45 to 64, and 12.1% who were 65 years of age or older. The median age was 39 years. For every 100 females, there were 103.8 males. For every 100 females age 18 and over, there were 99.7 males.

The median income for a household in the city was $53,576, and the median income for a family was $65,684. Males had a median income of $43,431 versus $30,264 for females. The per capita income for the city was $30,525. About 1.9% of families and 2.5% of the population were below the poverty line, including 1.8% of those under age 18 and 2.9% of those age 65 or over.

Education
Duval County Public Schools operates public schools. Schools in Neptune Beach include:
 Neptune Beach Elementary School
 Duncan U. Fletcher Middle School
 Duncan U. Fletcher High School

Jacksonville Public Library operates the Beaches Branch in Neptune Beach.

Gallery

See also
 Jacksonville Beaches
 Duval County, Florida
 Greater Jacksonville
 National Register of Historic Places listings in Duval County, Florida

References

External links

 
 

Beaches of Duval County, Florida
Beaches of Florida
Cities in Duval County, Florida
Cities in Florida
Cities in the Jacksonville metropolitan area
Populated coastal places in Florida on the Atlantic Ocean
Port cities and towns of the Florida Atlantic coast